Exploring Time is a two-hour TV documentary mini-series about natural time scale changes that aired in 2007 on The Science Channel.

The documentary is a co-production of Twin Cities Public Television, Red Hill Studios, and NHK. It was made possible by a major grant from the National Science Foundation, and produced in association with Arte France and Granada International.

Part/Hour 1
Introduction to Timescales: Days to Decades
Decades to Centuries
Centuries to Thousand of Years
Thousands of Years to Millions of Years
 of Millions of Years
Billions of Years, The Lifespan of the Universe

Part/Hour 2
Introduction to Smaller and Smaller Timescales
Human Perception of Time, From Days to Hours
Hours to seconds
Seconds to Tenths of Seconds
Tenths of Seconds to Milliseconds
Milliseconds to Microseconds
Microseconds to Nanoseconds
Nanoseconds to Attoseconds
Attoseconds to Planck Time
Planck Time, the Shortest Timescale Imaginable

External links
Official Website

American documentary television films
Documentary films about science
Films about time
Science Channel original programming